David Romero may refer to:

 David Romero Ellner (died 2020), Honduran journalist
 David Romero (pentathlete) (1929–2011), Mexican pentathlete
 David A. Romero (born 1984), Mexican-American spoken word artist, poet and activist